Songo Airport  serves the town of Songo, Mozambique. Construction of the airport started in 1971.

Airlines and destinations 
Currently, there are no regularly scheduled flights.

References 

 OurAirports - Songo
  Great Circle Mapper - Songo
 Google Earth

External links 
  transairways

Airports in Mozambique